Kara Elizabeth Walker (born November 26, 1969) is an American contemporary painter, silhouettist, print-maker, installation artist, filmmaker, and professor who explores race, gender, sexuality, violence, and identity in her work. She is best known for her room-size tableaux of black cut-paper silhouettes. Walker was awarded a MacArthur fellowship in 1997, at the age of 28, becoming one of the youngest ever recipients of the award. She has been the Tepper Chair in Visual Arts at the Mason Gross School of the Arts, Rutgers University since 2015.

Walker is regarded as among the most prominent and acclaimed Black American artists working today.

Early life and education
Walker was born in 1969 in Stockton, California. Her father, Larry Walker, was a painter and professor. Her mother Gwendolyn was an administrative assistant. A  2007 review in the New York Times described her early life as calm, noting that "nothing about [Walker's] very early life would seem to have predestined her for this task. Born in 1969, she grew up in an integrated California suburb, part of a generation for whom the uplift and fervor of the civil rights movement and the want-it-now anger of Black Power were yesterday's news."

When Walker was 13, her father accepted a position at Georgia State University. They settled in the city of Stone Mountain. The move was a culture shock for the young artist. In sharp contrast with the multi-cultural environment of coastal California, Stone Mountain still held Ku Klux Klan rallies. At her new high school, Walker recalls, "I was called a 'nigger,' told I looked like a monkey, accused (I didn't know it was an accusation) of being a 'Yankee.'" 

Walker received her BFA from the Atlanta College of Art in 1991 and her MFA from the Rhode Island School of Design in 1994. Walker found herself uncomfortable and afraid to address race within her art during her early college years, worrying it would be received as "typical" or "obvious"; however, she began introducing race into her art while attending Rhode Island School of Design for her Master's.

Walker recalls reflecting on her father's influence: "One of my earliest memories involves sitting on my dad's lap in his studio in the garage of our house and watching him draw. I remember thinking: 'I want to do that, too,' and I pretty much decided then and there at age 2½ or 3 that I was an artist just like Dad."

Work and career
Walker is best known for her panoramic friezes of cut-paper silhouettes, usually black figures against a white wall, which address the history of American slavery and racism through violent and unsettling imagery. She has also produced works in gouache, watercolor, video animation, shadow puppets, "magic-lantern" projections, as well as large-scale sculptural installations like her ambitious public exhibition with Creative Time called "A Subtlety, or the Marvelous Sugar Baby, an Homage to the unpaid and overworked Artisans who have refined our Sweet tastes from the cane fields to the Kitchens of the New World on the Occasion of the demolition of the Domino Sugar Refining Plant" (2014). The black and white silhouettes confront the realities of history while also using the stereotypes from the era of slavery to relate to persistent modern-day concerns. Her exploration of American racism can be applied to other countries and cultures regarding relations between race and gender, and reminds us of the power of art to defy conventions.

She first came to the art world's attention in 1994 with her mural "Gone, An Historical Romance of a Civil War as It Occurred Between the Dusky Thighs of One Young Negress and Her Heart." This cut-paper silhouette mural, presenting an Antebellum south filled with sex and slavery, was an instant hit. At the age of 28, she became the second youngest recipient of the John D. and Catherine T. MacArthur Foundation's "genius" grant, second only to renowned Mayanist David Stuart. In 2007, the Walker Art Center exhibition "Kara Walker: My Complement, My Oppressor, My Enemy, My Love" was the artist's first full-scale US museum survey.

Her influences include Andy Warhol, whose art Walker says she admired as a child, Adrian Piper, and Robert Colescott.

Walker's silhouette images work to bridge unfinished folklore in the Antebellum South, raising identity and gender issues for African-American women in particular. Walker uses images from historical textbooks to show how enslaved African Americans were depicted during Antebellum South. The silhouette was typically a genteel tradition in American art history; it was often used for family portraits and book illustrations. Walker carried on this portrait tradition but used them to create characters in a nightmarish world, a world that reveals the brutality of American racism and inequality.

Walker incorporates ominous, sharp fragments of the South's landscape, such as Spanish moss trees and a giant moon obscured by dramatic clouds. These images surround the viewer and create a circular, claustrophobic space. This circular format paid homage to another art form, the 360-degree historical painting known as the cyclorama.

Some of her images are grotesque; for example, in "The Battle of Atlanta,"  a white man, presumably a Southern soldier, is raping a black girl while her brother watches in shock; a white child is about to insert his sword into a nearly-lynched black woman's vagina; and a male black slave rains tears all over an adolescent white boy. The use of physical stereotypes such as flatter profiles, bigger lips, straighter nose, and longer hair helps the viewer immediately distinguish the black subjects from the white subjects. Walker depicts the inequalities and mistreatment of African Americans by their white counterparts. Viewers at the Studio Museum in Harlem looked sickly, shocked, and appalled upon seeing her exhibition. Thelma Golden, the museum's chief curator, said that "throughout her career, Walker has challenged and changed the way we look at and understand American history. Her work is provocative, emotionally wrenching, yet overwhelmingly beautiful and intellectually compelling." Walker has said that her work addresses the way Americans look at racism with a "soft focus," avoiding "the confluence of disgust and desire and voluptuousness that are all wrapped up in [...] racism."

In an interview with New York's Museum of Modern Art, Walker stated: "I guess there was a little bit of a slight rebellion, maybe a little bit of a renegade desire that made me realize at some point in my adolescence that I really liked pictures that told stories of things– genre paintings, historical paintings– the sort of derivatives we get in contemporary society."

Notable works 
In her piece created in 2000, "Insurrection! (Our Tools Were Rudimentary, Yet We Pressed On)", the silhouetted characters are against a background of colored light projections. This gives the piece a transparent quality, evocative of the production cels from the animated films of the 1930s. It also references the plantation story " Gone With the Wind" and the Technicolor film based on it. Also, the light projectors were set up so that the shadows of the viewers were cast on the wall, making them characters and encouraging them to assess the work's tough themes. In 2005, she created the exhibit "8 Possible Beginnings" or: "The Creation of African-America, a Moving Picture," which introduced moving images and sound. This helped further immerse the viewers into her dark worlds. In this exhibit, the silhouettes are used as shadow puppets. Additionally, she uses the voice of herself and her daughter to suggest how the heritage of early American slavery has affected her image as an artist and woman of color.

In response to Hurricane Katrina, Walker created "After the Deluge" since the hurricane had devastated many poor and black areas of New Orleans. Walker was bombarded with news images of "black corporeality." She likened these casualties to enslaved Africans piled onto ships for the Middle Passage, the Atlantic crossing to America.

Walker took part in the 2009 inaugural exhibition at Scaramouche Gallery in New York City with a group exhibit called "The Practice of Joy Before Death; It Just Wouldn't Be a Party Without You." Recent works by Kara Walker include Frum Grace, Miss Pipi's Blue Tale (April–June 2011) at Lehmann Maupin, in collaboration with Sikkema Jenkins & Co. A concurrent exhibition, "Dust Jackets for the Niggerati- and Supporting Dissertations, Drawings submitted ruefully by Dr. Kara E. Walker," opened at Sikkema Jenkins on the same day.

Walker created "Katastwóf Karavan" for the 2018 art festival "Prospect.4: The Lotus in Spite of the Swamp" in New Orleans. This sculpture was an old-timey wagon, with Walker's signature silhouettes portraying slaveholders and enslaved people making up the sides and a custom-built steam-powered calliope playing songs off "black protest and celebration."

Although Walker is known for her serious exhibitions with an overall deep meaning behind her work, she admits relying on "humor and viewer interaction." Walker has stated, "I didn't want a completely passive viewer" and "I wanted to make work where the viewer wouldn't walk away; he would either giggle nervously, get pulled into history, into fiction, into something totally demeaning and possibly very beautiful."

Commissions
In 2002, Walker created a site-specific installation, "An Abbreviated Emancipation (from a larger work: The Emancipation Approximation)," which was commissioned by The University of Michigan Museum of Art, Ann Arbor. The work represented motifs and themes of race relations and their roots in the system of slavery before the Civil War.

In 2005, The New School unveiled Walker's first public art installation, a site-specific mural titled "Event Horizon," and placed along a grand stairway leading from the main lobby to a major public program space.

In May 2014, Walker debuted her first sculpture, a monumental piece and public artwork entitled "A Subtlety, or the Marvelous Sugar Baby, an Homage to the unpaid and overworked Artisans who have refined our Sweet tastes from the cane fields to the Kitchens of the New World on the Occasion of the demolition of the Domino Sugar Refining Plant." The massive work was installed in the derelict Domino Sugar Refinery in Brooklyn and commissioned by Creative Time. The installation consisted of a female sphinx figure, measuring approximately 75 feet long by 35 feet high, preceded by an arrangement of fifteen life-size young male figures, dubbed attendants. The sphinx, which bore the head and features of the Mammy archetype, was made by covering a core of machine-cut blocks of polystyrene with 80 tons of white sugar donated by Domino Foods. The fifteen male attendants were modeled after racist figurines that Walker purchased online. Five were made from solid sugar, and the other ten were resin sculptures coated in molasses. The fifteen attendants stood 60 inches tall and weighed 300-500 pounds each. The factory and the artwork were demolished after the exhibition closed in July 2014, as had been previously planned.

Walker has hinted that the whiteness of the sugar references its "aesthetic, clean, and pure quality." The slave trade is highlighted in the sculpture as well. Remarking on the overwhelmingly white audience at the exhibition in tandem with the political and historical content of the installation, art critic Jamilah King argued that "the exhibit itself is a striking and incredibly well-executed commentary on the historical relationship between race and capital, namely the money made off the backs of black slaves on sugar plantations throughout the Western Hemisphere. So the presence of so many white people -- and my presence as a black woman who's a descendant of slaves -- seemed to also be part of the show." The work attracted over 130,000 visitors in its eight-weekend run. In his commentary on the sculpture, art historian Richard J. Powell wrote, "No matter how noble or celebratory in tone Walker's title for this work seemed, in this post-modern moment of moral skepticism and collective distrust, a work of art in a public arena—especially a visually perplexing nude—would be subjected to not just serious criticism, but Internet trolling and mockery."

In 2016, Walker revealed "Slaughter of the Innocents (They Might be Guilty of Something)." In the painting, Walker depicts an African American woman slicing a baby with a small scythe. The influence for this detail was that of Margaret Garner, an enslaved person who killed her daughter to prevent her child from returning to slavery.

In 2019, Walker created "Fons Americanus," the fifth annual Hyundai Commission at Tate Modern 's Turbine Hall. In her review of Walker's "Fons Americanus" for Artnet News, Naomi Rea noted that "the piece is so loaded with art-historical and cultural references that you could teach an entire college history course without leaving Turbine Hall." She also observed that – owing to the fountain's running water – the great work of art could be both seen and heard in the Turbine Hall. The artwork is, at the same time, a sort of public monument inspired in part by the Victoria Memorial in front of Buckingham Palace. In 2019, acclaimed writer Zadie Smith observed something about public monuments that Walker interrogates in "Fons Americanus": "Monuments are complacent; they put a seal upon the past, they release us from dread. For Walker, dread is an engine: it prompts us to remember and rightly fear the ruins we shouldn't want to return to and don't wish to re-create—if we're wise."

Other projects
For the season 1998/1999 in the Vienna State Opera, Walker designed a large-scale picture (176 m2) as part of the exhibition series "Safety Curtain," conceived by museum in progress. In 2009, Walker curated volume 11 of Merge Records', Score!. Invited by fellow artist Mark Bradford in 2010 to develop a set of free lesson plans for K-12 teachers at the J. Paul Getty Museum, Walker offered a lesson that had students collaborating on a story by exchanging text messages.

In March 2012, artist Clifford Owens performed a score by Walker at MoMA PS1.

In 2013, Walker produced 16 lithographs for a limited edition, fine art printing of the libretto Porgy & Bess, by DuBose Heyward and Ira Gershwin, published by the Arion Press.

Controversy

The Detroit Institute of Art removed her "The Means to an End: A Shadow Drama in Five Acts" (1995) from a 1999 exhibition "Where the Girls Are: Prints by Women from the DIA's Collection" when African-American artists and collectors protested its presence. The five-panel silhouette of an antebellum plantation scene was in the permanent collection and was to be re-exhibited at some point according to a DIA spokesperson.

A Walker piece entitled "The moral arc of history ideally bends towards justice but just as soon as not curves back around toward barbarism, sadism, and unrestrained chaos" caused controversy among employees at Newark Public Library who questioned its appropriateness for the reading room where it was hung. The artwork included depictions of the Ku Klux Klan accompanied by a burning cross, a naked black woman fellating a white man, and Barack Obama. The piece was covered but not removed in December 2012. After discussion among employees and trustees the work was again uncovered. In March 2013 Walker visited the New Jersey Newark Public Library to discuss the work and the controversy. Walker discussed the content of the work, including racism, identity, and her use of "heroic" figures such as Obama. Walker asked, "[d]o these archetypes collapse history? They're supposed to expand the conversation, but they often collapse it." Walker described the overwhelming subject matter of her works as a "too-muchness".

In the 1999 PBS documentary "I'll Make Me a World," African-American artist Betye Saar criticized Walker's work for its "revolting and negative" depiction of black stereotypes and enslaved people. Saar accused the art of pandering to the enjoyment of "the white art establishment." In 1997 Saar emailed 200 fellow artists and politicians to voice her concerns about Walker's use of racist and sexist imagery and its positive reception in the art world.  This attention to Walker's practice led to a 1998 symposium at Harvard University, Change a Joke and Slip the Yoke: A Harvard University Conference on Racist Imagery, which discussed her work.

Exhibitions
Walker's first museum survey, in 2007, was organized by Philippe Vergne for the Walker Art Center in Minneapolis and traveled to the Whitney Museum in New York, the Hammer Museum in Los Angeles, and the ARC/Musee d'Art Moderne de la ville de Paris.

Solo exhibitions
 2013: We at the Camden Arts Centre are Exceedingly Proud to present an Exhibition of Capable Artworks by the Notable Hand of the Celebrated American, Kara Elizabeth Walker, Negress, Camden Art Centre, London (toured to the MAC, Belfast in 2014)
2014: "A Subtlety, or the Marvelous Sugar Baby, an Homage to the unpaid and overworked Artisans who have refined our Sweet tastes from the cane fields to the Kitchens of the New World on the Occasion of the demolition of the Domino Sugar Refining Plant," Creative Time, Brooklyn, NY.
 2016: "The Ecstasy of St. Kara," Cleveland Museum of Art.
 2017: "Sikkema Jenkins and Co. is Compelled to Present the Most Astounding And Important Painting Show of the Fall Art Show Viewing Season!", Sikkema Jenkins & Co., New York, NY.
2019: Untitled – Hyundai Commission, Tate Modern.
  2021: "A Black Hole is Everything a Star Longs to Be," Kunstmuseum Basel, Switzerland
  2021-21: Kara Walker: Cut to the Quick, Cincinnati  Art Museum, Cincinnati, OH
  2023: Kara Walker: Harper’s Pictorial History of the Civil War (Annotated), New york Historical Society Museum and Library, New York, NY

Collections
Among the public collections holding work by Walker are the Minneapolis Institute of Art and the Weisman Art Museum (Minneapolis, Minnesota); the Tate Collection, London; the Museum of Contemporary Art, Los Angeles, the Madison Museum of Contemporary Art (Madison, WI), the Menil Collection, Houston; and the Muscarelle Museum of Art, Williamsburg, Virginia. Early large-scale cut-paper works have been collected by, among others, Jeffrey Deitch and Dakis Joannou.

Recognition
In 1997, Walker, who was 28 at the time, was one of the youngest people to receive a MacArthur fellowship. There was a lot of criticism because of her fame at such a young age and the fact that her art was most popular within the white community. In 2007, Walker was listed among Time magazine's 100 Most Influential People in The World, Artists and Entertainers, in a citation written by fellow artist Barbara Kruger. In 2012, she was elected to the American Academy of Arts and Letters. She was elected to the American Philosophical Society in 2018.

Walker has received the Deutsche Bank Prize and the Larry Aldrich Award. She was the United States representative for the 25th International São Paulo Biennial in Brazil (2002). She is the 2005 Larry Aldrich Award recipient. In 2016 completed a residency at the American Academy in Rome.

Walker has been featured on PBS. Her work appears on the cover of musician Arto Lindsay 's recording, "Salt" (2004). In addition, she co-wrote the song "Suicide Demo for Kara Walker" on the Destroyer album "Kaputt."

Her name appears in the lyrics of the Le Tigre song "Hot Topic."

In 2017, a large scale mural portrait of Kara Walker done by artist Chuck Close was installed in a New York City subway station (Q line, 86th Street), part of a MTA public arts program.

in 2019 Walker was elected to the Royal Academy of Arts in London, as an Honorary Royal Academician (HonRA).

Personal life
Early in her career, Walker lived in Providence, Rhode Island with her husband, German-born jewelry professor Klaus Bürgel, whom she married in 1996. In 1997, she gave birth to a daughter. The couple separated, and their divorce was finalized in 2010. As of 2017, Walker is in a relationship with photographer and filmmaker Ari Marcopoulos.

Walker moved to Fort Greene, Brooklyn in 2003 and has been a professor of visual arts in the MFA program at Columbia University since then. She maintained a studio in the Garment District, Manhattan from 2010 until 2017. In May 2017, she moved her art practice to a studio in Industry City. She also owns a country home in rural Massachusetts.

In addition to her own practice, Walker served on the board of directors of the Foundation for Contemporary Arts (FCA) between 2011 and 2016.

Further reading

Articles
 D'Arcy, David. "Kara Walker Kicks Up a Storm," "Modern Painters" (April 2006).
 Garrett, Shawn-Marie. "Return of the Repressed," "Theater" 32, no. 2 (Summer 2002).
 Kazanjian, Dodie. "Cut it Out," "Vogue" (May 2005).
 Szabo, Julia. "Kara Walker's Shock Art," "New York Times Magazine" 146, no. 50740 (March 1997).
 Walker, Hamza. "Kara Walker: Cut it Out," "Nka: Journal of Contemporary African Art" no. 11/12 (Fall/Winter 2000).
 Als, Hilton. "The Shadow Act," "The New Yorker", October 8, 2007
 Als, Hilton. "The Sugar Sphinx," "The New Yorker", May 8, 2014
 Scott, Andrea K. "Kara Walker's Ghosts of Future Evil", the "New Yorker", September 9, 2017
Wall, David. "Transgression, Excess, and the Violence of Looking in the Art of Kara Walker," "Oxford Art Journal" vol. 33, no. 3 (2010). https://www.jstor.org/stable/40983288?seq=1#metadata_info_tab_contents

Non-fiction books and catalogues
 Barrett, Terry. "Interpreting Art: Reflecting, Wondering, and Responding", New York: McGraw Hill (2002).
 Berry, Ian, Darby English, Vivian Patterson, Mark Reinhardt, eds. "Narratives of a Negress, Boston: MIT Press (2003).
 Carpenter, Elizabeth and Joan Rothfuss. "Bits & Pieces Put Together to Present a Semblance of A Whole: Walker Art Center Collections". Minneapolis: Walker Art Center, 2005.
 Géré, Vanina. "Kara Walker", October Files series, The MIT Press (2022). https://mitpress.mit.edu/9780262544474/kara-walker/
 Jacobs, Harriet. "Incidents in the Life of a Slave Girl" (1858).
 Shaw, Gwendolyn Dubois. "Seeing the Unspeakable: The Art of Kara Walker", Durham and London: Duke University Press (2004). http://www.worldcat.org/oclc/55008318
 Vergne, Philippe, et al. "Kara Walker: My Complement, My Enemy, My Oppressor, My Love". Minneapolis: Walker Art Center, 2007. http://www.worldcat.org/oclc/602217956
 Walker, Kara E. "Kara Walker: After the Deluge". New York: Rizzoli, 2007. http://www.worldcat.org/oclc/144225309
 Walker, Kara E., Olga Gambari, and Richard Flood. Kara Walker: A Negress of Noteworthy Talent. Torino: Fondazione Merz, 2011. http://www.worldcat.org/oclc/768397358

Web sources
 The Art Story: Kara Walker, Modern Art Insight. 2016

Notes

References
 
 Goldbaum, Karen, ed. "Kara Walker: Pictures From Another Time." Seattle: Marquand Books, Inc. 
Smith, Zadie. "What Do We Want History to Do to Us?" "The New York Review of Books", February 27, 2020. https://www.nybooks.com/articles/2020/02/27/kara-walker-what-do-we-want-history-to-do-to-us/
 Vergne, Phillppe. "Kara Walker: My Complement, My Enemy, My Oppressor, My Love." Minneapolis: Walker Art Center. 

External links

 Kara Walker website
 The "Time" 100: "Time" magazine's profile of Walker
 Biography, interviews, essays, artwork images and video clips from PBS series Art:21 -- Art in the Twenty-First Century - Season 2 (2003)
 Kara E. Walker's Song of the South at REDCAT
 Kara Walker at Ocula''
Kara Walker at Smithsonian American Art Museum

1969 births
Living people
20th-century African-American artists
20th-century African-American women
20th-century American printmakers
20th-century American women artists
21st-century African-American artists
21st-century African-American women
21st-century American women artists
African-American contemporary artists
African-American painters
African-American printmakers
African-American sculptors
African-American women artists
American conceptual artists
American contemporary artists
American contemporary painters
American installation artists
American women academics
American women printmakers
Artists from Stockton, California
Atlanta College of Art alumni
Columbia University faculty
Fellows of the American Academy of Arts and Sciences
MacArthur Fellows
Members of the American Philosophical Society
Painters from California
People from Fort Greene, Brooklyn
Postmodern artists
Rhode Island School of Design alumni
Sculptors from California
Silhouettists
Members of the American Academy of Arts and Letters